The TCDD Taşımacılık A.Ş. operates a 12,532 km long system throughout Turkey and currently 90% of the network is served by passenger rail.

Intercity services
The second main intercity service of the company are the mainline trains known as Express or Main Line. These trains connect major Turkish cities throughout the country but they are progressively stopped as the YHT network expands.

Non-subsidised routes:

Regional services
District 1
Istanbul-Uzunköprü Regional 
Alpullu-Kapıkule Regional
İstanbul-Kapıkule Regional
Alpullu-Uzunköprü Regional
İstanbul-Çerkezköy Regional
Muratlı-Tekirdağ Regional
Haydarpaşa-Adapazarı Regional - 2nd busiest Regional line
District 2
Ankara-Kırıkkale Regional
Ankara-Polatlı Regional
Zonguldak-Karabük Regional
District 3
Basmane-Ödemiş Regional - 3rd busiest regional line
Basmane-Tire Regional
Basmane-Nazilli Regional
Basmane-Denizli Regional
Söke-Aydın-Nazilli Regional
Basmane-Söke Regional
Basmane-Uşak Regional
Manisa-Alaşehir Regional
District 4
Sivas-Samsun Regional
Samsun-Amasya Regional
Amasya-Havza Regional
Amasya-Hacıbayram Regional
Sivas-Divriği Regional
Divriği-Erzincan Regional
Kars-Akyaka Regional
District 5
Diyarbakır-Batman Regional
Diyarbakır-Kurtalan Regional
Diyarbakır-Kürk Regional
Tatvan-Elazığ Regional
District 6
Adana-Mersin Regional - Busiest regional line
Islahiye-Adana Regional
Gaziantep-Nusaybin Regional
Mersin-İskenderun Regional
District 7
Afyon-Eskişehir Regional
Kütahya-Eskişehir Regional

TCDD routes
TCDD routes
Turkish State Railways